Balázs Schrancz (born 7 August 1977 in Budapest) is a Hungarian football player who currently plays for Pécsi Mecsek FC.

References 
HLSZ
EUFO
Pecs MFC Official Website

1977 births
Living people
Hungarian footballers
Hungarian expatriate footballers
Ferencvárosi TC footballers
Budapest Honvéd FC players
APOP Kinyras FC players
Cypriot First Division players
Expatriate footballers in Cyprus
Association football midfielders
FSV Optik Rathenow players
Footballers from Budapest